The Eastern Dry Forest lies at the eastern end of Grand Cayman, one of the Cayman Islands, a British Overseas Territory in the Caribbean Sea. It is one of the territory's Important Bird Areas (IBAs).

Description
Eastern Dry Forest is a 239 ha tract of native tropical dry forest lying north of the town of East End. The only area of dry forest left at the eastern end of the island, it is privately owned, unprotected and is subject to clearance and fragmentation. In the 1980s the site contained some of the largest trees on the island and was an important breeding site for parrots.

Birds
The IBA was identified as such by BirdLife International because it supports populations of Cuban amazons, Caribbean elaenias, thick-billed vireos, Yucatan vireos and vitelline warblers.

References

Important Bird Areas of the Cayman Islands
Tropical and subtropical dry broadleaf forests
Grand Cayman